Events in the year 1920 in Mexico.

Incumbents

Federal government 
President: Venustiano Carranza until May 21, Adolfo de la Huerta, Alvaro Obregon from December 1
Secretary of War and Navy: Benjamín G. Hill
Secretary of the Interior: Gilberto Valenzuela, José Inociencio Lugo, Plutarco Elias Calles from December 1

Governors 
 Aguascalientes: Aurelio L. González/Rafael Arellano Valle
 Campeche: Enrique Arias Solís/Eduardo Arceo Zumárraga/Gonzalo Sales Guerrero
 Chiapas: Pascual Morales Molina/Tiburcio Fernández Ruíz
 Chihuahua: Andrés Ortiz/Ignacio C. Enríquez
 Coahuila: Gustavo Espinoza Mireles
 Colima: Miguel Álvarez García
 Durango:  
 Guanajuato: Federico Montes/Toribio Villaseñor/Agustín de Ezcurdia/Antonio Madrazo/Enrique Colunga
 Guerrero: Francisco Figueroa Mata
 Hidalgo: 
 Jalisco: Ignacio Ramos Praslow/Francisco Labastida Izquierdo
 State of Mexico:  
 Michoacán: 
 Morelos: 
 Nayarit: Francisco D. Santiago/Fernando S. Ibarra/Salvador Arriola Valdés/José Santos Godínez
 Nuevo León: José E. Santos/Humberto Barros/Felix G. Lozano/Porfirio G. González
 Oaxaca: Manuel García Vigil
 Puebla: Alfonso Cabrera Lobato/Rafael Rojas/Luis Sánchez Pontón
 Querétaro: Salvador Argain Domínguez/Fernando N. Villarreal/Rómulo de la Torre/José M. Truchuelo
 San Luis Potosí: Severino Martínez Gómez/Rafael Nieto Compéan
 Sinaloa: Ramón F. Iturbe/Ángel Flores
 Sonora: Adolfo de la Huerta
 Tabasco: Carlos Greene Ramírez
 Tamaulipas: Francisco González Villarreal/Rafael Cárdenas/Emilio Portes Gil/Federico Martínez Rojas/José Morante
 Tlaxcala: 	 
 Veracruz: Cándido Aguilar Vargas/Adalberto Tejeda Olivares
 Yucatán: 
 Zacatecas:

Events

 January 3: The 7.8  Veracruz earthquake affected the eastern part of the country with a maximum Mercalli intensity of X–XII. Between 648–4,000 were killed and 167 were injured.
 April 23: Plan of Agua Prieta is proclaimed; rebellion against Venustiano Carranza commences.
 June 1: Adolfo de la Huerta becomes provisional president.
 September 5: Federal elections.
 December 1:  Álvaro Obregón becomes president after winning the federal election.

Popular culture

Sports

Music

Film
 Hasta después de la muerte
 El Zarco or Los Plateados

Literature

Notable births
January 14 – Chava Flores, musical chronicler Álbum de Oro de la Canción and composer (Dos horas de balazos and La tertulia) (d. August 5, 1987)
February 13 – Carlos Quintero Arce, Mexican Roman Catholic prelate, Archbishop of Hermosillo (1968–1996)
April 20 — José de las Fuentes Rodríguez, lawyer and politician (PRI); Governor of Coahuila 1981–1987 (d. 2011)
 June 16 – José López Portillo, president of Mexico (1970–1976)
 July 29 – Rodolfo Acosta, television actor
 November 25 – Ricardo Montalbán, actor (died 2009)

Notable deaths
 May 21 – President Venustiano Carranza (b. 1859) is assassinated by Rodolfo Herrero.
 June 2 — Francisco Plancarte y Navarrete, archaeologist and archbishop of Monterrey, 1911-1920 (b. 1856)
 December 14 – Gen. Benjamín Hill, Secretary of War, dies in suspicious circumstances. (b. 1877)

References

 
Years of the 20th century in Mexico
Mexico